Américo Pereira da Silva (?–?) was a Portuguese footballer who played as a forward.

See also
Football in Portugal
List of football clubs in Portugal

References

External links

Place of birth missing
Portuguese footballers
Association football forwards
Casa Pia A.C. players
Portugal international footballers
Year of birth missing
Year of death missing